Dustin Sofyan (born 29 July 1994) is an Indonesian racing driver.

Career

Karting

He won third place in the Asian Karting Open Championship - ROK Junior 2006.

Asian series
Sofyan began his car racing career in his native continent, competing in the Formula BMW Pacific in 2009. He competed in all the races that season and finished in fifth position in the final standings. In 2010, he returned to the Formula BMW Pacific series, where he raced in every round except round 3 in China. He finished seventh in the final standings. He also competed in two rounds of the equivalent Formula BMW Europe, racing in round 5 and 8.

In 2011 he raced in the Formula Pilota China, where he competed in all the races and finished third in the final overall standings, but won the Asian Trophy, since he was the leader from all the other Asian drivers. He also competed in the Formula Abarth gaining points for the European Championship.

Racing record

Career summary

† – As Sofyan was a guest driver, he was ineligible for points.

References

External links
 

1994 births
Living people
Sportspeople from Jakarta
Indonesian racing drivers
Formula BMW Pacific drivers
Formula BMW Europe drivers
Formula Masters China drivers
Formula Abarth drivers
20th-century Indonesian people
21st-century Indonesian people
Team Meritus drivers
EuroInternational drivers
DAMS drivers